Cigombong Station (CGB) is a class III railway station located in Cigombong, Cigombong, Bogor Regency. The station, which is located at an altitude of +699 m, is included in the Operation Area I Jakarta.

Services 
The following is a list of train services at the Cigombong Station.

Passenger services
 Mixed class
 Pangrango, towards  and towards  (executive-economy)

References

Bogor Regency
Railway stations in West Java
Railway stations opened in 1881